Vladimir Maljković (born 14 August 1982) is a Croatian retired footballer who played as a defender.

Club career
He made his debut on the professional league level in the Bundesliga for Eintracht Frankfurt on 12 December 2000 when he started in a game against VfB Stuttgart, he scored an own goal in that game. He also played for their reserves.

References

1982 births
Living people
Association football defenders
Croatian footballers
NK Zagreb players
Eintracht Frankfurt II players
Eintracht Frankfurt players
NK Croatia Sesvete players
Bundesliga players
Regionalliga players
Croatian expatriate footballers
Expatriate footballers in Germany
Croatian expatriate sportspeople in Germany